Erling Meirik (born 17 December 1948) is a Norwegian former football and football executive. Born in Levanger, he played for Rosenborg between 1970 and 1976, being capped 134 times and scoring 14 goals. He was Rosenborg's top scorer in the 1970 season with five goals. He also represented the Norway national team on 13 occasions between 1972 and 1975. He was later hired as president of Rosenborg. He withdrew as president in 1983 as a consequence of the unsuccessful hiring of Tommy Cavanagh as manager.

References
Bibliography

Notes

1948 births
Living people
People from Levanger
Norwegian footballers
Rosenborg BK players
Eliteserien players
Rosenborg BK non-playing staff
Association football midfielders
Norway international footballers
Sportspeople from Trøndelag